A by-election was held for the Australian House of Representatives seat of Bradfield on 20 December 1952. This was triggered by the death of Liberal Party MP and former Prime Minister Billy Hughes.

The election was won by Liberal Party candidate Harry Turner on a severely reduced margin, but against an Independent candidate rather than one from the Labor Party, which did not field a candidate in the safe Liberal seat.

Results

See also
 List of Australian federal by-elections

References

1952 elections in Australia
New South Wales federal by-elections